Amer Jukan (born 28 November 1978) is a Slovenian football midfielder of Bosnian descent who plays for SV Oberdrauburg.

Honours

Hapoel Petah Tikva F.C.
Toto Cup: 2004–05

Interblock
Slovenian Cup: 2008–09

References

External links 
Player profile at PrvaLiga 

1978 births
Living people
Slovenian footballers
Slovenian expatriate footballers
Slovenia international footballers
Association football midfielders
Enosis Neon Paralimni FC players
FC Koper players
NK Mura players
HNK Cibalia players
Hapoel Petah Tikva F.C. players
NK IB 1975 Ljubljana players
NK Krka players
NK Marsonia players
NK Primorje players
Slovenian PrvaLiga players
Croatian Football League players
Cypriot First Division players
Israeli Premier League players
People from Gračanica, Bosnia and Herzegovina
Bosnia and Herzegovina emigrants to Slovenia
Expatriate footballers in Croatia
Expatriate footballers in Israel
Expatriate footballers in Cyprus
Expatriate footballers in Austria
Slovenian expatriate sportspeople in Croatia
Slovenian expatriate sportspeople in Israel
Slovenian expatriate sportspeople in Cyprus
Slovenian expatriate sportspeople in Austria
MNK Izola players